Austen Pleasants (born August 22, 1997) is an American football guard for the Los Angeles Chargers of the National Football League (NFL). He played college football at Ohio.

Early life 
Austen Pleasants was born on August 22, 1997 in Ironton, Ohio, son of Michael Wilburn and Jennifer Vanderhoof-Pleasants. He attended Dawson-Bryant High School in Coal Grove, Ohio and was a four year letterman in football, basketball, and Track and Field. He earned multiple honors while playing as an offensive lineman and defensive tackle and was a 2-star recruit as a lineman. He accepted a football scholarship offer from Ohio University over University of Akron and University of Toledo.

College career 
Pleasants redshirted his first college year for Ohio but finished his career with 28 games and 20 starts. He earned Second-team All-MAC honors in 2019.

Professional career

Jacksonville Jaguars 
On April 25, 2020, Pleasants was signed by the Jacksonville Jaguars after going undrafted in the 2020 NFL Draft. On September 7, 2020, he was signed to their practice squad after being waived the day before. On October 18, 2020, he was placed on the practice squad/COVID-19 list. He was activated off the list on October 22, 2020. After being waived in September 2021, he was signed to Jaguars practice squad on October 9, 2021. On October 12, 2021, he was released from the practice squad.

Carolina Panthers 
Pleasants was signed to the Carolina Panthers practice squad on October 12, 2021, the same day he was released from the Jaguars. He was elevated to the active roster on November 27, 2021 and played his first career game in the Week 12 10–33 loss against the Miami Dolphins. On January 11, 2022, he signed a reserve/future contract with the team. On August 22, 2022, Pleasants was waived by the Panthers.

Los Angeles Chargers 
On November 9, 2022, Pleasants was signed to the Los Angeles Chargers practice squad. He signed a reserve/future contract on January 17, 2023.

References 

1997 births
American football guards
Carolina Panthers players
Living people
Los Angeles Chargers players